Lazy Susan is a restaurant in Portland, Oregon.

Description and history

Lazy Susan is a restaurant in the southeast Portland part of the Montavilla neighborhood. The restaurant opened in early 2020, weeks before the COVID-19 pandemic's arrival, in the space which previously housed The Country Cat. According to Brooke Jackson-Glidden and Alex Frane of Eater Portland, "when COVID-19 hit, the team pivoted into something closer to a backyard cookout, with grilled meats, potato salad, and seasonal vegetable sides". The menu has included oysters, morels, prawns, and short ribs. Lazy Susan also serves slushies, described by Frane and Michelle Lopez of Eater Portland as "generally goofy, fun, and incredibly well-balanced, using unusual twists to temper sweetness". The restaurant's seating capacity is approximately 64.

For Thanksgiving in 2021, the restaurant's special dinner menu included turkey pot pie, mashed potatoes with wild mushroom gravy, squash, chicory salad, and crackers with whitefish spread, butterscotch pumpkin pie, and select wines by the bottle. The Hanukkah menu included wild mushroom matzah ball soup, sufganiyah, beef-tallow-fried hash browns, bialys, whitefish spread, and king salmon gravlax.

Reception
Eater Portland Brooke Jackson-Glidden included Lazy Susan in a 2021 overview of "Where to Find Weekend Brunch in Portland" and a 2022 list of "18 Date-Worthy Restaurants in Portland Actually Open on Mondays". She and Alex Frane included the restaurant in a 2022 list of "19 Jaw-Dropping Happy Hours Spotted Across Portland". Frane and Nathan Williams included Lazy Susan in a 2022 list of "Where to Drink and Dine in Historic Montavilla".

References

External links

 
 

2020 establishments in Oregon
Montavilla, Portland, Oregon
Restaurants established in 2020
Restaurants in Portland, Oregon
Southeast Portland, Oregon